Energy market is a type of commodity market that deal with electricity, heat, and fuel products. Major commodities being natural gas and electricity. Other commodities traded in the energy market are: oil, coal, carbon emissions (greenhouse gases), nuclear power, solar energy, and wind energy. Due to the difficulty in storing and transporting energy, current and future prices in energy are rarely linked. This is because energy purchased at current prices is difficult to store and sell at a later date. There are two types of markets namely spot market and forward market.

Typically energy development is the result of a government creating an energy policy that encourages the development of an energy industry in a competitive manner.

Until the 1970s when energy markets underwent dramatic changes, they were characterised by monopoly-based organisational structures.  Most of the world's petroleum reserves were controlled by the Seven Sisters.  Circumstances changed considerably in 1973 as the influence of OPEC grew and the repercussions of the 1973 oil crisis affected global energy markets.

Liberalization and regulation
Energy markets have been liberalized in some countries; they are regulated by national and international authorities (including liberalized markets) to protect consumer rights and avoid oligopolies. Regulators includes the Australian Energy Market Commission in Australia; the Energy Market Authority in Singapore; the Energy Community in Europe, replacing the South-East Europe Regional Energy Market; and the Nordic energy market for Nordic countries. Members of the European Union are required to liberalize their energy markets.

Regulators seek to discourage volatility of prices, reform markets if needed, and search for evidence of anti-competitive behavior such as the formation of a monopoly.

Due to the increase in oil price since 2003 and the increase of speculation, energy markets are being reviewed and by 2008, several conferences were organized to address the energy market sentiments of petroleum importing nations. In Russia, the markets are being reformed by the introduction of harmonized and all-Russian consumer prices.

Current and past energy usage in the United States

The United States currently uses over four trillion kilowatt-hours per year in order to fulfill its energy needs. Data given by the United States Energy Information Administration (EIA) shows a steady growth in energy usage dating back to 1990, which showed the United States used around 3 trillion kilowatt hours of energy that year. Traditionally, the energy sources used to fulfill the United States energy needs have been oil, coal, nuclear, renewable energy, and natural gas. The breakdown of each of these fuels as a percentage of the overall consumption in the year 1993, according to the data given by the EIA is as follows; coal was 53%, nuclear energy was 19%, natural gas was 13%, renewable energy was 11%, and oil provided 4% of the overall energy needs. In 2011, the breakdown was as follows; coal was 42%, nuclear was 19%, natural gas was 25%, renewable energy was 13% and oil dropped down to 1%. These figures show a dramatic drop in energy from coal, and a significant increase in both natural gas as well as renewable energy. 
	
According to the United States Geological Survey (USGS) data from 2006, hydroelectric power accounted for most of the renewable energy production in the United States. However, increasing government funding, grants, and incentives have been drawing many companies towards the biofuel, wind, and solar energy production industries.

Moving towards renewable energy
In recent years, there has been a movement towards renewable and sustainable energy in the United States. This has been caused by many factors, including the threat of climate change, cost, government funding, tax incentives, and potential profits in the energy market of the United States. According to the most recent projections by the EIA out to the year 2040, the renewable energy industry will be growing from providing 13% of the power in the year 2011 to 16% in 2040. This is equivalent to 32% of the overall growth during this time period. This large increase has the potential to be very lucrative for companies wishing to tap into the renewable energy market in the United States. 
	
This movement towards renewable energy has also been affected by the stability of the global market. Recent economic instability in countries in the Middle East and elsewhere has driven American companies to further develop American dependence on foreign sources of energy, such as oil. The long term projections by the United States Energy Information Administration for renewable energy capacity in the United States is also sensitive to factors such as the cost of domestic oil and natural gas production, prices, and availability.

Countries around the world also face the challenge of up-skilling professionals in order to create the workforce required for the transition from fossil fuel to renewable energy. Organisations such as the Renewable Energy Institute are assisting with this transition, much more is required to meet targets set by governments around the world, targets in line with the Paris Agreement set to help combat climate change.

Renewable energy sources
Currently, the majority of the United States’ renewable energy production comes from hydroelectric power, solar power, and wind power. According to the U.S. Department of Energy, the cost of wind power doubled between the years of 2002 to 2008. However, since then, the prices of wind power have declined by 1/3, on average. Various factors have been contributing to the decline in the cost of wind power, such as government subsidies, tax breaks, technological advancement, and the cost of  oil and natural gas. 
	
Hydroelectric power has been the most predominant source of renewable energy for quite some time due to the fact that it has been proven to be reliable and has been in use for quite some time. This source of energy has provided the majority of renewable energy and has been a significant source of overall energy production in the United States.  The problem with traditional hydroelectric power has been the requirement of damming rivers and other sources of water.  The problem created by damming is that the natural environment of the area is disrupted due to the formation of a lake caused by the damming of the water source. This creates uproar by environmentalists and a large obstacle to clear before being able to build a hydroelectric plant. However, new forms of hydroelectric power that harness wave energy from the oceans have been in development in recent years. Although these power sources still need much development before they become economically viable, they do have potential to become significant sources of energy.

In recent years, wind energy and solar energy have made the largest steps towards significant energy production in the United States. These sources have little impact on the environment and have the highest potential of renewable energy sources used today. Advances in technology, government tax rebates, subsidies, grants, and economic need have all lead to huge steps towards the usage of sustainable wind and solar energy today.

Energy market in the U.S.
The energy industry is the third-largest industry in the United States. This market is expected to have an investment of over $700 billion over the next two decades according to selectusa. This allows for large amount of advancement in technological development in the near future. There are also many federal resources enticing both domestic and foreign companies to send investments towards the renewable energy industry in the United States. These federal resources include the Department of Energy Loan Guarantee, the American Reinvestment and Recovery Act, the Smart Grid Stimulus Program, as well as an Executive Order on Industrial Energy Efficiency. All these programs allow for a very lucrative investment for companies wishing to compete in the energy industry in the United States. With the advancement of technology in recent years, harnessing the power of wind, solar, and hydroelectric resources in the United States will become the focus of the United States’ shift towards alternative energy. This should also drive down the price of oil due to a decrease in demand. There are more incentives now than ever before to develop these technologies and bring them into greater use.

See also

Commodity value
Cost competitiveness of fuel sources
Demand destruction
Energy crisis
Energy derivative
Energy intensity
Food vs. fuel
Renewable energy commercialization
Cost of electricity by source
Spark spread

References

Energy economics